Zuninaspis is an extinct genus of trilobite arthropod. It lived during the Arenig stage of the Ordovician Period, approximately 478 to 471 million years ago in what is now Argentina.

References 

Ordovician trilobites of South America
Ordovician Argentina
Asaphidae